North Labuhanbatu Regency (Kabupaten Labuhanbatu Utara, alternatively Kabupaten Labuhan Batu Utara) is a regency of North Sumatra, Indonesia, created in 2007 by being carved out of the existing Labuhanbatu Regency, which in 2000 covered an area of 9,322.5 square kilometres and had a population of 840,382 according to the 2000 census. 60.99% of the regency is forested. The new North Labuhanbatu Regency covers 3,545.8 square kilometres and had a population of 331,660 at the 2010 Census, rising to 381,994 at the 2020 Census.

The Kualuh River is located in this regency

Administrative districts 
The regency is divided administratively into eight districts (kecamatan), tabulated below with their areas and their populations at the 2010 Census and 2020 Census, together with the locations of the district centres.

References

Regencies of North Sumatra